This page shows the results of the Men's Wrestling Competition at the 1979 Pan American Games, held from July 1 to July 15, 1979, in San Juan, Puerto Rico.

Men's Freestyle

Freestyle (– 48 kg)

Freestyle (– 52 kg)

Freestyle (– 57 kg)

Freestyle (– 62 kg)

Freestyle (– 68 kg)

Freestyle (– 74 kg)

Freestyle (– 82 kg)

Freestyle (– 90 kg)

Freestyle (– 100 kg)

Freestyle (+ 100 kg)

Men's Greco-Roman

Greco-Roman (– 48 kg)

Greco-Roman (– 52 kg)

Greco-Roman (– 57 kg)

Greco-Roman (– 62 kg)

Greco-Roman (– 68 kg)

Greco-Roman (– 74 kg)

Greco-Roman (– 82 kg)

Greco-Roman (– 90 kg)

Greco-Roman (– 100 kg)

Greco-Roman (+ 100 kg)

Medal table

See also
 Wrestling at the 1980 Summer Olympics

References
 Sports 123

1979 Pan American Games
P
1979
Wrestling in Puerto Rico